Lophocampa maroniensis is a moth of the family Erebidae. It was described by William Schaus in 1905. It is found in Costa Rica, Panama, French Guiana and Venezuela.

Subspecies
Lophocampa maroniensis maroniensis (French Guiana, Venezuela)
Lophocampa maroniensis buchwaldi (Rothschild, 1910)

References

 

maroniensis
Moths described in 1905
Moths of Central America
Moths of South America